The 2018 United States House of Representatives election in Montana was held on November 6, 2018, to elect the U.S. representative from Montana's at-large congressional district. The election coincided with other elections to the House of Representatives, elections to the United States Senate, and various state and local elections.

Republican primary

Candidates

Declared
Greg Gianforte, incumbent U.S. Representative

Primary results

Democratic primary

Candidates

Declared
John Heenan, attorney
Grant Kier, former executive director of the Five Valleys Land Trust
Jared Pettinato, attorney
Kathleen Williams, former state representative

Withdrew
Lynda Moss, former state senator (but remained on the ballot)

Primary results

Libertarian primary

Candidates

Declared
 Elinor Swanson, attorney

General election

Debates
Complete video of debate, September 29, 2018
Complete video of debate, October 6, 2018

Predictions

Endorsements

Polling

Results 
Gianforte defeated Kathleen Williams on November 6, 2018.

See also 
 2018 United States House of Representatives elections

References

External links
Candidates at Vote Smart 
Candidates at Ballotpedia 
Campaign finance at FEC 
Campaign finance at OpenSecrets

Official campaign websites
Greg Gianforte (R) for Congress
Elinor Swanson (L) for Congress
Kathleen Williams (D) for Congress

2018
Montana
United States House of Representatives